Eupithecia bolterii is a moth in the family Geometridae first described by George Duryea Hulst in 1900. It is found in the US states of Arizona and Texas.

The wingspan is about 18–20 mm. The ground color of the forewings is gray. They are crossed by numerous fine lines. Adults are on wing in early spring.

References

Moths described in 1900
bolterii
Moths of North America